Sinister Street is a 1922 British silent drama film directed by George Beranger and starring John Stuart, Amy Verity and Maudie Dunham. It was adapted from the 1913–14 novel Sinister Street by Compton MacKenzie.

Cast
 John Stuart as Michael Fane 
 Amy Verity as Stella Fane 
 Maudie Dunham as Lily Haden 
 Molly Adair as Sylvia Scarlett 
 Charles Tilson-Chowne as Lord Saxby 
 Roger Tréville as George Ayliff 
 Kate Carew as Mrs. Fane 
 A.G. Poulton   
 Wilfred Fletcher   
 John Reid  
 Kathleen Blake  
 Marjorie Day

References

External links

1922 films
British drama films
Films based on British novels
Films directed by George Beranger
Ideal Film Company films
British black-and-white films
British silent feature films
1922 drama films
1920s English-language films
1920s British films
Silent drama films